A gestor or gestoría is person who, in Spain or Mexico, deals with administrative bureaucracy on behalf of a client. In Spain they are not required to be a licensed attorney. In Spain, Gestors are listed in the Páginas Amarillas (the yellow pages) as "gestorias".

Notes

Law of Spain
Law of Mexico
Region-specific legal occupations